Cariquima is a highland town in Chile. The town is a few kilometers south of Colchane, in the Tarapacá Region of Chile. It can be found on the slopes of Nevado Cariquima or Mama Huanapa. It is a central meeting point for Aymara indigenous communities. The town has a clinic, a school, electricity (during the afternoons) and an airport which was built by the Chilean Air Force in 2003.

The church in Cariquima is the oldest architectural building in the town since 2006 which also serves as a historical monument. Cariquima also has a nearby river.

History 
The origin of "Cariquima" has not yet been determined. On November 24, San Juan, the town's Chief Patron, is celebrated. In addition to the Catholic religion introduced in colonial times, in Cariquima almost 50% of the population are also Pentecostal.

Nearby towns 

 Ancovinto
 Ancuaque
 Chijo
 Chulluncane
 Huaytane
 Panavinto
 Quebe
 Villablanca

References 

Populated places in Tarapacá Region
Communes of Chile